Leucoagaricus moseri is a species of agaric fungus found in Europe. The species was originally described as Lepiota moseri by Solomon Wasser in 1975. The specific epithet honours Austrian mycologist Meinhard Moser. Wasser transferred the fungus to the genus Leucoagaricus in 1978.

See also

List of Leucoagaricus species

References

moseri
Fungi of Europe
Fungi described in 1978